Internet time may refer to:

 Network Time Protocol (NTP), a method for synchronising device clocks via Internet
 Swatch Internet Time, a unit of decimal time
 Time server, an Internet server that distributes time information to clients